Johan Martinus "Joop" Langhorst (21 June 1943 – 9 October 2013) was a Dutch professional association football player who played as a right back defender.

Club career
Born in Rotterdam, Netherlands, Langhorst debuted with Sparta Rotterdam on 18 December 1966 against Sittardia. He played 68 games in three seasons. In his first season, the club won the KNVB Cup, defeating ADO Den Haag 1–0. In 1969, he signed with S.V.V., where, in his debut season, the team won the Eerste Divisie (First Division) and the championship. Langhorst retired the following season.

Death
Langhorst moved from Rotterdam to Sneek and died in Groningen at age 70 on 9 October 2013.

References

External links
 Langhorst profile at footballdatabase.eu
 Obituary at mensenlinq.nl  
 Career stats – ELF

1943 births
2013 deaths
Footballers from Rotterdam
People from Sneek
Dutch footballers
Association football defenders
Eredivisie players
Eerste Divisie players
Sparta Rotterdam players
SV SVV players
Footballers from Friesland